Only Every Time is the second and final album from American rock band The Graduate.  It was released on August 31, 2010.

Track listing
 "Don't Die Digging" – 3:56
 "Sirens" – 3:25
 "Stuck (Inside My Head)" – 4:11
 "Make Believe" – 3:16
 "Pull Me In" – 4:36
 "Choke" – 3:21
 "Halfway There" – 3:56
 "Permanent Tourists" – 4:18
 "All At Once" – 3:43
 "End of the World Delight" – 4:00
 "For the Missing" – 2:44
 "Into the Blue" (iTunes Bonus Track) – 3:02

Personnel
 Corey Warning – vocals
 Matt Kennedy – guitar, keyboard, vocals
 Max Sauer – guitar, vocals
 Jared Wuestenberg – bass
 Tim Moore – drums
 Brian McTernan – record producer

References

2010 albums
The Graduate (band) albums
Razor & Tie albums
Albums produced by Brian McTernan